Schiff Nutrition International (NYSE: SHF) was a company based in Salt Lake City, and is the manufacturer of dietary supplements such as Airborne, MegaRed, and Move Free.

Founded by Joe Weider as Weider Nutrition (NYSE: WNI) in 1936, considered the first sports nutrition company. As Weider Nutrition, they were the creators of Tiger's Milk nutrition bars, and related products, one of the earliest lines of sports foods.

It was acquired by Reckitt Benckiser after a 1.4 billion US$ deal in 2012. Its name continues to be used on the company's products.

References

Manufacturing companies based in Salt Lake City
1940 establishments in Utah
Nutritional supplement companies of the United States
Sports nutrition